Haagen Krog Steffens (30 April 1873 – 9 May 1917) was a Norwegian historian, archivist and genealogist.

Haagen Krog Steffens was born in Christiania (now Oslo), Norway. He was the son of physician Henrich Steffens (1841-1984) and Asta Falch.   Steffens belonged to a family originating in Holstein. Both his father and grandfather were doctors and his family fostered a number of prominent individuals.
Steffens attended Christiania Cathedral School (now Oslo Cathedral School). Steffens graduated with a Candidate of Law degree in 1897. Later he undertook a series of studies at archives in Sweden, Denmark, Germany and Belgium. He  was hired was an archivist in the National Archival Services of Norway and had a decisive influence on the archive system.

His most important works were Norske slægter, released in two volumes in 1912 and 1915; Den norske Centraladministrasjons Historie 1814-1914, released in 1914; and Kragerø bys historie, released in 1916.  He was a published in both Morgenbladet and Aftenposten.

He is best known as a very diligent genealogist.  He wrote genealogies of several families, including the Mogensen, Mathiesen, Rod and Aall families.

He died in Oslo and was buried at  Vår Frelsers gravlund.

Selected works
 Hvitebjørn og Stubljan – En norsk Gaards og Slægts Historie  (1898)
 Linderud og slegterne Mogensen og Mathiesen  (1899)
 Selvig i Hurum – Et stykke norsk Gaards og Slægts Historie  (1902)
 Slegten Wiel  (1903)
 Herrebø Fayancefabrik og dens grundlægger Peter Hofnagel  (1904)
 Slegten Stang – Bidrag til Fredrikshalds Historie  (1905)
 Fru Emerentze Munch, f. Barclays Optegnelser  (1907)
 Slegten Aall  (1908)
 Fru Conradine Dunkers Erindringer  (1909)
 Norske Slægter 1912  (1912)
 Den Norske Centraladministrations Historie 1814–1914  (1914)
 Norske Slægter 1915  (1915)
 Kragerø Bys Historie 1666–1916  (1916)

References 

1873 births
1917 deaths
People educated at Oslo Cathedral School
20th-century Norwegian historians
Norwegian archivists
Norwegian genealogists
Burials at the Cemetery of Our Saviour